The CSS Working Group  (Cascading Style Sheets Working Group) is a working group created by the World Wide Web Consortium (W3C) in 1997, to tackle issues that had not been addressed with CSS level 1. As of December 2022, the CSSWG had 147 members.

The working group is co-chaired by Rossen Atanassov and Alan Stearns.

History
In early 1996 Håkon Wium Lie cooperated with Bert Bos, who was already developing a new browser language called SPP, to produce the first version of the CSS standard (CSS1). They presented their achievements twice, in 1994 and in 1996 at the "Mosaic and the Web" conferences in Chicago. The W3C was being established at that time and Lie's and Bos's work caught their attention.
 CSS level 1 emerged as a W3C Recommendation in December 1996.
 The same group working on CSS was also developing HTML and DOM. This group, the HTML Editorial Review Board, in 1997 was divided according to the three different programs.
 Chris Lilley managed the CSS Working Group, established in the W3C in February 1997, to deal with issues uncovered by the early implementation and adoption of CSS 1.
 The CSS 1 test suite was created by Eric A. Meyer, Håkon Wium Lie and Tim Boland along with other contributors, finishing in 2018.
 In late 1998 the first version of CSS 2 was released. In 1999 a revision (CSS 2.1) was released.
 By 1999 there are 15 members working in "Cascading Style Sheets and Formatting Properties Working Group."
 In 1999 work on CSS 3 started, but until 2006 it faced serious limitations.
 In 2005 the CSS Working Group decided that already published standards (CSS 2.1, CSS3 text etc.) should be re-examined and updated.

Benefits for members
CSS working group members belong to the broader organization W3C. This membership offers to them four important benefits; interaction, strategy, participation and leadership. The first characteristic provided, can be explained more as an opportunity to meet and work with “leading companies, organizations, and individuals” specialized in web technologies. “W3C Activity proposals” are strategically examined and operated by the members, giving them the ability to work methodically. Participating in the CSS working group allows members to change/shape technologies influencing businesses as well as consumers. Finally, CSS members are adopting a significant role into the W3C project of developing the Web standards, which requires leadership skills and dedication.

Members
Members of the CSS Working Group include representatives from the following organizations:

 Adobe Systems Inc.
 Apple
 Google, Inc.
 Igalia
 Microsoft
 Mozilla

W3C has also invited a few experts to collaborate with the working group:
 Brian Birtles
 Amy Carney
 Elika Etemad
 Dael Jackson
 Brad Kemper
 Jirka Kosek
 Vladimir Levantovsky
 Peter Linss
 Jonathan Neal
 François Remy
 Florian Rivoal
 Miriam Suzanne
 Lea Verou
 Sebastian Zartner

There are a few W3C staff members also participating in the group:
 Richard Ishida
 Chris Lilley
 Michael[tm] Smith
 Fuqiao Xue

Editors
Active editors of CSS Specifications include the following:
 Rossen Atanassov
 Tab Atkins Jr.
 David Baron (computer scientist)
 Tantek Çelik
 John Daggett
 Elika Etemad
 Simon Fraser
 Chris Lilley
 Florian Rivoal
 Lea Verou

References

External links
Official site
CSS WG members

 Working Group 
Working groups
World Wide Web Consortium